Sebastian Praus (born August 31, 1980 in Dresden) is a German short-track speed-skater.

Praus competed at the 2006 and 2010 Winter Olympics for Germany. In 2006, he finished third in the opening heat of the 1000 metres, but was advanced to the quarterfinals, where he finished third again, failing to advance. In the 1500 metres, he finished fourth in his opening race, not advancing. He also competed in the 5000 metre relay, finishing third in the semifinal and second in the B Final to end up 7th overall. In 2010, he finished third in the opening round o fht e1500 metres, then third in the semifinal, advancing to the B Final. He finished 5th in that race to end up 11th overall. He again raced with the German 5000 metre relay team, which had an identical result, ending up 7th. His best overall finish was in the 2006 1000 metres, when he placed 10th overall.

As of 2013, Praus's best performance at the World Championships came in 2010, when he won a bronze medal as a member of the German 5000m relay team. His best individual performance at a World Championships was in 2004, when he came 10th in the 1500 metres. He has also won two gold medals as a member of the German relay team at the European Championships.

As of 2013, Praus has four ISU Short Track Speed Skating World Cup podium finishes, all bronze medals as part of the German relay team. His top World Cup ranking is 7th, in the 1500 metres in 2004–05.

World Cup Podiums

References 

1980 births
Living people
German male short track speed skaters
Olympic short track speed skaters of Germany
Short track speed skaters at the 2006 Winter Olympics
Short track speed skaters at the 2010 Winter Olympics
World Short Track Speed Skating Championships medalists
Sportspeople from Dresden